Estonian pavilion houses Estonia's national representation during Venice Biennale arts festivals.

Outside of the central, international exhibition, individual nations produce their own shows, known as pavilions, as their national representation. Nations that own their pavilion buildings, such as the 30 housed on the Giardini della Biennale, are responsible for their own upkeep and construction costs as well. Nations without dedicated buildings create pavilions in venues throughout the city. Estonia doesn't have a special building for the pavilion and therefore throughout the years the exhibitions have been located in various places across Venice. In 2019, the Estonian pavilion was located on the island of Giudecca. For the 59th Venice biennale, the Dutch pavilion, historically located at Giardini, offered its pavilion, designed by Gerrit Rietveld, to Estonia.

Estonian Centre for Contemporary Art has been the official organiser of the Estonian pavilion since 1999. The exhibition for the Estonian pavilion is selected through an open call and the winner is decided by an international jury. Estonian participation at the Venice Biennale is supported by the Ministry of Culture.

Representation by year

References 

Venice Biennale
National pavilions
Estonian art